The 2017–18 Second League was the 63rd season of the Second League, the second tier of the Bulgarian football league system, and the 2nd season under this name and current league structure. The fixture list was released on 22 June 2017.

Teams
The following teams have changed division since the 2016–17 season.

To Second League 
Promoted from Third League
 Chernomorets Balchik
 Maritsa Plovdiv
 Litex
 Strumska Slava

Relegated from First League
 Lokomotiv Gorna Oryahovitsa
 Montana
 Neftochimic

From Second League 
Relegated to Third League
 CSKA Sofia II
 Spartak Pleven
 Bansko
 Levski Karlovo

Promoted to First League
 Etar
 Septemvri Sofia
 Vitosha Bistritsa

a.Zagorets, the champions of South-East Third League, declined promotion due to financial and organizational reasons; Maritsa Plovdiv took their place as runners-up.
b.CSKA Sofia II officially declined to participate in the South-West Third League and was dissolved.

Stadia and locations

A.Maritsa Plovdiv will play at Botev 1912 Football Complex because their Maritsa Stadium is not licensed for Second League.
B.Montana will play at Kiprovets Stadium in Chiprovtsi due to ongoing renovation works at their Ogosta Stadium.
C.Neftochimic will play at Gradski Stadium in Balgarovo for financial reasons.
D.Pomorie will play at Lazur Stadium in Burgas due to renovation works at their Pomorie Stadium.

Personnel and sponsorship
Note: Flags indicate national team as has been defined under FIFA eligibility rules. Players and managers may hold more than one non-FIFA nationality.

Note: Individual clubs may wear jerseys with advertising. However, only one sponsorship is permitted per jersey for official tournaments organised by UEFA in addition to that of the kit manufacturer (exceptions are made for non-profit organisations).
Clubs in the domestic league can have more than one sponsorship per jersey which can feature on the front of the shirt, incorporated with the main sponsor or in place of it; or on the back, either below the squad number or on the collar area. Shorts also have space available for advertisement.

Managerial changes

League table

Results

Top scorers

Notes

References 

2017-18
Bul
2